St. Andrews Islands is a group of islands of Papua New Guinea.

Islands of Papua New Guinea